In the 1938 FIFA World Cup qualification Group 3, the two teams played against each other on a home-and-away basis. The winner Poland qualified for the third FIFA World Cup held in France.

Matches

Poland vs Yugoslavia

Yugoslavia vs Poland

Poland qualified on goal difference.

Team stats

Head coach:  Józef Kałuża

Head coach:  Svetozar Popović

References

External links
FIFA World Cup Official Site - 1938 World Cup Qualification

3
1937 in Polish football
qual
1937–38 in Yugoslav football